The Ethiopian Patriotic Association is a national organization of all Ethiopians that is created to honour the gallant sons and daughters of Ethiopia who fought and defeated the Italian invading colonial power during the period of World War II. The association has been serving this purpose the past 60 years and stayed a symbol of national sovereignty.

References

Political organisations based in Ethiopia